Carlos Romeo Monteagudo Alfaro (born April 29, 1985) is a Salvadoran professional footballer.

Club career

Independiente Nacional 1906
Monteagudo started his professional career at hometown club Independiente Nacional 1906 in 2004. However, for the bad luck of Monteagudo, Independiente Nacional 1906 descended in the Clausura 2007 tournament to Segunda División.

In December 2008, Monteagudo along with his club and national team teammate Manuel Salazar, both were invited to have trials with Mexican Primera División A team Monterrey 1a. A (effectively CF Monterreys reserve team), with the hopes of signing with the club's Second Division side.

After the two-week trial, Monteagudo was close to signing with the Mexican side, but ultimately he was not offered a contract, and he returned to El Salvador.

Luis Ángel Firpo
In 2007, Monteagudo signed with Luis Ángel Firpo. With the team of Usulután Monteagudo won the Apertura 2007, Clausura 2008 and Clausura 2013. Also he lost the Clausura 2009 final against Isidro Metapán.

In the second leg of the semi-finals of the Clausura 2013, Monteagudo scored a crucial goal against Alianza in a 1–0 victory at the Sergio Torres Stadium. This goal allowed Luis Ángel Firpo to reach the final against FAS in the Estadio Cuscatlán.

Audaz
Monteagudo signed with Audaz in 2015.

Atlético Marte
Monteagudo signed with Atlético Marte in the Apertura 2015 tournament. In the Clausura 2016, Atlético Marte suffered a severe administrative, economic and sports crisis. Atlético Marte ended up descending with two games remaining for the end of the tournament.

Dragón
He signed with Dragón in the Apertura 2016 tournament.

Return to Audaz
Monteagudo signed again with Audaz for the Clausura 2018 tournament. Audaz was the newly promoted team in the previous tournament, the Apertura 2017. With Audaz, Monteagudo reached the quarter-finals of the Apertura 2018, but the team of San Vicente was eliminated by Águila 3–4 on aggregate.

Match-fixing ban
On September 20, 2013, Monteagudo was banned for 18 months due to his involvement with match-fixing.

International career
Monteagudo officially received his first cap on November 15, 2006 when he came on as a substitute in a friendly match against Bolivia.

He scored his first goal for El Salvador on March 26, 2008 in a 2010 World Cup qualifying match against Anguilla. He has earned a total of 9 caps, scoring 1 goal and has represented his country in 2 FIFA World Cup qualification matches.

His most recent international game was an August 2009 friendly match against Colombia.

International goals
Scores and results list El Salvador's goal tally first.

References

External links
 

1985 births
Living people
People from San Vicente, El Salvador
Association football midfielders
Salvadoran footballers
El Salvador international footballers
C.D. Luis Ángel Firpo footballers
Sportspeople involved in betting scandals
2013 Copa Centroamericana players
C.D. Atlético Marte footballers
C.D. Dragón footballers